Muhadjiri Hakizimana (born 13 August 1994) is a Rwandan professional footballer who plays for the Rwandan national team.

Career

Club
On 26 June 2022, Hakizimana joined Saudi Arabian club Al-Kholood.

International
He debuted internationally on 3 November 2016 for the 2017 Africa Cup of Nations qualification and scored his first goal against Ghana in a 1-1 draw.

At the 2022 FIFA World Cup qualification, he scored two goals in each leg in two consecutive victories against Seychelles.

Career statistics

International goals
Scores and results list Rwanda's goal tally first.

Honours

Individual
 Rwanda Premier League player of the year: 2018

References

External links
 
 
 

1994 births
Living people
Rwandan footballers
Rwandan expatriate footballers
Rwanda international footballers
Etincelles F.C. players
S.C. Kiyovu Sports players
APR F.C. players
Emirates Club players
Al-Kholood Club players
UAE First Division League players
Saudi First Division League players
Expatriate footballers in the United Arab Emirates
Expatriate footballers in Saudi Arabia
Association football midfielders
2018 African Nations Championship players
Rwanda A' international footballers
Rwandan expatriate sportspeople in Saudi Arabia
Rwandan expatriate sportspeople in the United Arab Emirates
2020 African Nations Championship players